Fine Woodworking is a woodworking magazine published by Taunton Press in Newtown, Connecticut, USA.

History and profile
The magazine began publication in 1975, with simple monochrome printing and stapled monochrome covers.

The magazine focuses on the very best of woodworking techniques at the highest level of skill. Articles include practical tutorials on technique, the theory of timber, finishes or tools, as well as showcases for high-quality finished work. The magazine emphasizes high-quality work regardless of the difficulty of execution.

There are many "project" articles.

Notable contributors
 Tage Frid
 R. Bruce Hoadley
 Richard Raffan

Related publications
Since the  first issues, subscribers have collected back issues. Taunton encourages this, with sales of back issues and the publication of  indexes.

Collected volumes have also been produced in book form. These began as collections of the best general articles in a numbered series '"Fine Woodworking" Techniques' (8 volumes from 1985 to 1986). Later there were more strongly-themed "Best of Fine Woodworking" collections on particular topics such as: "Joinery", "Making and Modifying Machines", "Bending Wood", "Woodshop Specialities" and many others.

Taunton also operates a website for Fine Woodworking.

References

External links
 

Hobby magazines published in the United States
Monthly magazines published in the United States
Magazines established in 1975
Magazines published in Connecticut
Woodworking magazines
Arts and crafts magazines